Nangal is a small village near Nihal Singh Wala Tehsil in the Moga district of Punjab, India. This small village had a population of nearly 2500 according to the 2011 census.

History

Population
, the village's population was 2641.

Religious sites
 Gurdwara Sitalsar Sahib
 Asthaan of Baba Tapa Ram Ji
 Temple Devi Dwalia

Other attractions
 Martyr Park
 Village library

See also 
Bode
Badhni Kalan

External links
 Facebook Page

References

Villages in Moga district